Jacob Tremblay (born October 5, 2006) is a Canadian actor. He is the recipient of various accolades, including a Canadian Screen Award, a Critics' Choice Movie Award, a Young Artist Award, and nominations for a Screen Actors Guild Award, two Saturn Awards and an Empire Award.

He starred as Jack Newsome in Room (2015), for which he won a Critics' Choice Award, a Canadian Screen Award, and became the youngest nominee for the Screen Actors Guild Award for Outstanding Performance by a Male Actor in a Supporting Role. He subsequently went on to roles as August Pullman, a child with Treacher Collins syndrome, in the drama Wonder (2017), which earned him an additional Critics Choice Award nomination; Max in the film Good Boys (2019); a cameo role in Doctor Sleep (2019), which was the sequel to The Shining; and voice roles as Damian Wayne / Robin in Harley Quinn (2019) and the title character of the Pixar film Luca (2021).

Early life
Tremblay was born on October 5, 2006, in Vancouver, British Columbia. His father is a police detective, and his mother is a homemaker. Tremblay's older sister Emma and younger sister Erica are also actors.

Career
Tremblay began acting in television roles. He made his film debut in the live-action/animated feature The Smurfs 2, released in 2013.

Tremblay portrayed Jack Newsome in the critically acclaimed drama film Room, co-starring with Brie Larson. The film, directed by Lenny Abrahamson, premiered on September 4, 2015, at the Telluride Film Festival, and was released in cinemas on October 16, 2015. For his performance, he was nominated for the 2015 Screen Actors Guild Award for Outstanding Performance by a Male Actor in a Supporting Role, becoming the youngest actor nominated for that award and the second-youngest in all categories.

In 2016, Tremblay played a supporting role in the comedy film Donald Trump's The Art of the Deal: The Movie; and guest-starred as the younger version of the main character, Phil Miller, on Fox's post-apocalyptic comedy series The Last Man on Earth. That same year, he starred in the horror film Before I Wake, with Kate Bosworth and Thomas Jane, and played a supporting role in the psychological thriller Shut In, alongside Naomi Watts, and co-starring Oliver Platt, and directed by Farren Blackburn. He also portrayed Wes Firth in the adventure comedy-drama Burn Your Maps, starring with Vera Farmiga and Marton Csokas.

In 2017, Tremblay played Peter Carpenter in director Colin Trevorrow's drama film The Book of Henry, co-starring with Naomi Watts and Maddie Ziegler. He also starred as August Pullman, a child with Treacher Collins syndrome, in Wonder, based on R.J. Palacio's novel of the same name. The latter film proved to be his most successful, earning over $285 million against a $20 million budget. In 2019, Tremblay made his comedy debut by headlining the R-rated comedy Good Boys co-starring with Brady Noon and Keith L. Williams. Good Boys earned $21 million during its opening weekend, becoming the first R-rated comedy since The Boss, which was released in April 2016, to finish first at the box office.

Tremblay brought his fellow actors to tears with his cameo performance in Doctor Sleep, the 2019 sequel to The Shining, as a kidnapped boy who is tortured to death in a scene which director Mike Flanagan initially feared would be too traumatic to include in the final cut. Commenting on the performance, Flanagan said "he's one of the best actors I’ve ever worked with in my entire life."

In July 2019, it was announced that he will be voicing Flounder in the live-action adaptation of Disney's The Little Mermaid, directed by Rob Marshall.  Tremblay voices Robin in the DC Universe adult animation series Harley Quinn. On October 16, 2020, he was  featured in the video for Justin Bieber's new track "Lonely" with record producer Benny Blanco.

Tremblay provided the voice of the titular character in the Pixar film Luca.

Personal life
Tremblay resides in Langley, British Columbia with his family. An avid fan of the Star Wars franchise, he named his dog after Daisy Ridley's character, Rey. His excitement at the characters C-3PO, R2-D2, and BB-8's appearance at the 88th Academy Awards ceremony was considered a highlight of the evening.

Filmography

Film

Television

Music video

Awards and nominations

References

External links
 

2006 births
Living people
21st-century Canadian male actors
Best Actor Genie and Canadian Screen Award winners
Canadian male film actors
Canadian male television actors
Canadian male voice actors
Canadian male child actors
Male actors from Vancouver
People from Langley, British Columbia (city)